Chesler may refer to:

Locations

 a village in the Romanian commune of Micăsasa
 the Chesler River, in Romania

People

 Oliver Chesler, musician better known as the Horrorist
 Harry "A" Chesler, a comic book publisher
 the Chesler Studio, which he ran
 Phyllis Chesler, an academic
 Evan Chesler, a lawyer
 Stanley R. Chesler, a judge